The World Is Not Enough, published in 1999, is the fifth novel by Raymond Benson featuring Ian Fleming's secret agent, James Bond based on the 1999 film of the same name. It was only the second James Bond novel  copyrighted by Ian Fleming Publications (formerly Glidrose Publications). It was published in the United Kingdom by Hodder & Stoughton and in the United States by Putnam.

Plot summary
The World Is Not Enough was adapted by then-current Bond novelist Raymond Benson from the screenplay by Neal Purvis, Robert Wade and Bruce Feirstein. It was Benson's fourth James Bond novel and followed the story closely, except in some details. For example, Elektra does not die immediately after Bond shoots her; instead, she begins quietly to sing. The novel also gave the Cigar Girl a name: Giulietta da Vinci, and retained a scene between her and Renard that was cut from theatrical release.  Also, Bond is still carrying his Walther PPK instead of the newer P99.

References

1999 British novels
James Bond books
Novels based on films
Novel
Hodder & Stoughton books
Novels set in Istanbul
Novels set in Kazakhstan
Novels set in London
Novels set in Spain
Novels set in Scotland